USNS Lawrence H. Gianella (T-AOT-1125) is a United States Military Sealift Command product tanker which typically carries diesel, gasoline, and JP5 (jet fuel).

Name origin
The vessel is named for Radio Operator Lawrence H. Gianella who was posthumously awarded the Merchant Marine Distinguished Service Medal in 1943 for the heroic action he undertook when his ship was torpedoed on 19 December 1941 in mid-Pacific. Orders had been given to abandon the rapidly sinking ship but Gianella - realizing that his shipmates chances of rescue were slim and dependent on him getting out an SOS message - stayed on board and rigged an emergency radio set, thus sacrificing himself for his shipmates.

Service

Among Lawrence H. Gianella’s multiple tasks, her reinforced steel bow enables her to battle through pack ice in southern seas and deliver fuel to McMurdo Station, Antarctica. On 1 July 2009, she shifted from the MSC's Sealift Program and began serving the Command's Prepositioning Program. The ships assigned to the program preposition U.S. Marine Corps vehicles, equipment, and ammunition throughout the world. Lawrence H. Gianella served the program by delivering petroleum products to Department of Defense storage and distribution facilities worldwide.

References

External links

  at the Naval Vessel Register
 USNS Lawrence H. Gianella (T-AOT 1125) entry at Military Sealift Command Ship Inventory
 US Navy Fact File on Transport Tankers - T-AOT
 

 

Champion-class tankers
Ships built in Tampa, Florida
1985 ships
Ships of the United States